Gurankesh-e Molla Goharam (also Romanized as Gūrānkesh-e Mollā Goharām and Gūrānkosh-e Mollā Gahrām; also known as Gorān Kash, Gowrān Kash-e Bālā, Gūrānkesh-e Bālā, Gūrān Kesh-e Bālā, Gūrānkesh-e Mollā Goharān, Gūrānkosh, Gūrān Kosh-e Bālā, Kūrānkoch-e Bālā, and Kūrānkosh) is a village in Kambel-e Soleyman Rural District, in the Central District of Chabahar County, Sistan and Baluchestan Province, Iran. At the 2006 census, its population was 74, in 20 families.

References 

Populated places in Chabahar County